Colin Ferguson (born 1972) is a Canadian–American actor.

Colin Ferguson may also refer to:

Colin Ferguson (born 1958), American mass murderer and perpetrator of the 1993 Long Island Rail Road shooting
Colin Ferguson, musician in H2O (Scottish band)

See also
Colen Ferguson (fl. 1913–1917), American politician